Nitta Station is the name of multiple train stations in Japan.

 Nitta Station (Fukushima) - (新田駅) in Fukushima Prefecture
 Nitta Station (Miyagi) - (新田駅) in Miyagi Prefecture

See also
 Musashi-Nitta Station - (武蔵新田駅), on the Tokyu Tamagawa Line in Ōta, Tokyo, Japan
 Izu-Nitta Station - (伊豆仁田駅), in Kannami, Shizuoka Prefecture, Japan
 Nitta (disambiguation)